Augusto Hamann Rademaker Grünewald (11 May 1905 – 13 September 1985) was a Brazilian admiral, of German and Danish descent, in the Brazilian Navy. Rademaker was one of the leaders of the Military Junta (30 August 1969 – 30 October 1969) that ruled Brazil between the illness of Artur da Costa e Silva in August 1969 and the investiture ceremony of Emílio Garrastazu Médici in October of that same year, elected by fellow officer generals and confirmed by the Congress. In the same occasions Rademaker was picked and "elected" as vice president for the same term as Medici's (1969–1974).

During his tenure as vice president he was awarded one of Portugal's highest honors, the Grand-Cross of the Order of the Tower and Sword on 26 July 1972. Before, in his capacity as Minister of the Navy, he was awarded the Grand-Cross of the Order of Aviz, Portugal's sole order reserved for military officials.

See also
 List of presidents of Brazil

References

1905 births
1985 deaths
People from Rio de Janeiro (city)
Brazilian people of German descent
Vice presidents of Brazil
Brazilian admirals
Brazilian people of Danish descent
Military dictatorship in Brazil
Grand Crosses of the Order of Aviz
Recipients of the Order of the Tower and Sword
Candidates for Vice President of Brazil